The following highways are numbered 142:

Cambodia 
 National Road 142 (Cambodia)

Canada
 Nova Scotia Highway 142
 Prince Edward Island Route 142

Costa Rica
 National Route 142

Japan
 Japan National Route 142
 Fukuoka Prefectural Route 142
 Nara Prefectural Route 142

Malaysia
 Malaysia Federal Route 142

United States
 Alabama State Route 142
 Arkansas Highway 142
 California State Route 142
 Colorado State Highway 142
 Connecticut Route 142
 Florida State Road 142 (pre-1945) (former)
 County Road 142 (Jefferson County, Florida)
 County Road 142 (Leon County, Florida)
 Georgia State Route 142
 Illinois Route 142
 Illinois Route 142A (former)
 Indiana State Road 142
 Iowa Highway 142 (former)
 Kentucky Route 142
 Louisiana Highway 142
 Maine State Route 142
 Maryland Route 142 (former)
 Massachusetts Route 142
 M-142 (Michigan highway)
 Missouri Route 142
 Nevada State Route 142 (former)
 New Hampshire Route 142
 New Mexico State Road 142
 New York State Route 142
 County Route 142 (Cayuga County, New York)
 County Route 142 (Erie County, New York)
 County Route 142 (Fulton County, New York)
 County Route 142A (Fulton County, New York)
 County Route 142 (Montgomery County, New York)
 County Route 142 (Niagara County, New York)
 County Route 142 (Rensselaer County, New York)
 County Route 142 (Sullivan County, New York)
 County Route 142 (Tompkins County, New York)
 North Carolina Highway 142
 Ohio State Route 142
 Oklahoma State Highway 142
 Pennsylvania Route 142 (former)
 Rhode Island Route 142 (former)
 Tennessee State Route 142
 Texas State Highway 142
 Texas State Highway Loop 142
 Farm to Market Road 142
 Utah State Route 142
 Vermont Route 142
 Virginia State Route 142
 Virginia State Route 142 (1923-1926) (former)
 Virginia State Route 142 (1932-1933) (former)
 Washington State Route 142
 Wisconsin Highway 142

Territories
 Puerto Rico Highway 142